Mexico–Senegal relations are the diplomatic relations between the United Mexican States and the Republic of Senegal. Both nations are members of the Group of 15 and the United Nations.

History
In April 1960, Senegal obtained its independence from France. In 1961, Mexican President Adolfo López Mateos sent a presidential delegation of goodwill, led by Special Envoy Alejandro Carrillo Marcor and Delegate José Ezequiel Iturriaga, to visit Senegal and to pave the way for the establishment of diplomatic relations between both nations. On 10 May 1962, Mexico and Senegal established diplomatic relations.

In May 1975, Senegalese President Léopold Sédar Senghor paid a visit to Mexico. During his visit to Mexico, both nations signed agreements on cultural and scientific cooperation and an agreement on technical cooperation. In July 1975, Mexican President Luis Echeverría reciprocated the visit and paid a state visit to Senegal, becoming the first sitting Mexican President to visit Africa. 

In 1991, Mexico closed its embassy in Senegal and in 1993, Mexico opened an honorary consulate in Dakar. In March 2002, Senegalese President Abdoulaye Wade paid a visit to the northern Mexican city of Monterrey to attend the International Conference on Financing for Development. In November 2014, Mexican Foreign Undersecretary, Carlos de Icaza, travelled to Dakar to attend the Organisation internationale de la Francophonie conference, where Mexico was admitted as an observer to the organization. 

In 2017, both nations celebrated 55 years of diplomatic relations.

High-level visits
High-level visits from Mexico to Senegal
 Special Envoy Alejandro Carrillo Marcor (1961)
 Delegate José Ezequiel Iturriaga (1961)
 President Luis Echeverría (1975)
 Foreign Undersecretary Lourdes Aranda (2013)
 Foreign Undersecretary Carlos de Icaza (2014)

High-level visits from Senegal to Mexico
 President Léopold Sédar Senghor (1975) 
 President Abdoulaye Wade (2002)
 Minister of State Djibo Leyti Kâ (2010)

Bilateral agreements 
Both nations have signed several bilateral agreements such as an Agreement on Cinematic Coproduction (1976); Agreement on Tourism (1976); Agreement on Cultural and Scientific Cooperation (1977) and an Agreement on Technical Cooperation (1977).

Trade
In 2018, trade between Mexico and Senegal totaled US$28 million. Mexico's main exports to Senegal include: machinery, electrical appliances for the sugar industry and machines for packaging liquids. Senegal's main exports to Mexico include: Ilmenite, zircon sands and molluscas. Senegal is Mexico's 153rd largest trading partner globally.

Diplomatic missions 
 Mexico is accredited to Senegal from its embassy in Rabat, Morocco. and maintains an honorary consulate in Dakar.
 Senegal is accredited to Mexico from its embassy in Washington, D.C., United States and maintains an honorary consulate in Mexico City.

References

Senegal
Mexico